Aubin Kouakou (born 1 June 1991, in Cubatão) is an Ivorian footballer who plays as a midfielder or center back.

Career 
He joined K League Challenge side Chungju Hummel in July 2016.

References

External links
 

1991 births
Living people
Ivorian footballers
Ivory Coast under-20 international footballers
Ivorian expatriate footballers
Association football midfielders
Stade Tunisien players
Chungju Hummel FC players
FC Anyang players
K League 2 players
Expatriate footballers in Morocco
Expatriate footballers in Tunisia
Expatriate footballers in South Korea
Ivorian expatriate sportspeople in Morocco
Ivorian expatriate sportspeople in Tunisia
Ivorian expatriate sportspeople in South Korea
Damac FC players
Saudi First Division League players
Saudi Professional League players
Ivorian expatriate sportspeople in Saudi Arabia
Expatriate footballers in Saudi Arabia
People from Cubatão